James Reginald Cook (born 1904) was an English professional footballer who played as a wing half.

References

1904 births
Footballers from Sunderland
English footballers
Association football wing halves
Chester-le-Street Town F.C. players
Grimsby Town F.C. players
West Stanley F.C. players
English Football League players
Date of death missing
Year of death missing